Karacailyas railway station is a railway station in Mersin, Turkey, on the Adana-Mersin railway. Located within the Akdeniz district in Mersin, the station is the easternmost station within the city. TCDD Taşımacılık operates daily regional train service from Mersin to Adana, İskenderun and İslahiye, with a total of 12 daily trains stopping at Karacailyas, in each direction.

Karacailyas station has two side platforms serving two tracks.

References

External links
TCDD Taşımacılık
Karacailyas station in Google Street View

Buildings and structures in Mersin
Railway stations in Mersin Province
Transport in Mersin